Graph morphism may refer to:
Graph homomorphism, in graph theory, a homomorphism between graphs
Graph morphism, in algebraic geometry, a type of morphism of schemes